The Reserve Infantry Division of Guangxi() is a reserve infantry formation of the People's Liberation Army.

The Reserve Division of Liuzhou was formally activated in 1984 in Liuzhou, Guangxi. The division was then composed of:
1st Regiment
2nd Regiment
3rd Regiment
Artillery Regiment

In 1985 the division was redesignated as the Reserve Infantry Division of Liuzhou().

The division participated in the Sino-Vietnam War.

On November 11, 1999, the division was then redesignated as the Reserve Infantry Division of Guangxi.

From 2017 the division was composed of:
1st Regiment - Laibin, Guangxi
2nd Regiment - Yulin, Guangxi
3rd Regiment - Qingzhou, Guangxi
Artillery Regiment - Liuzhou, Guangxi
Anti-Aircraft Artillery Regiment - Nanning, Guangxi

References

Reserve divisions of the People's Liberation Army
Military units and formations established in 1984